Ernest "Ernie" J. Ashcroft (28 February 1925 – May 1985) was an English professional rugby league footballer who played in the 1940s, 1950s and 1960s, and coached in the 1950s and 1960s.

Background
Ernie Ashcroft was born in Wigan, Lancashire, England, and he died aged 60 in Wigan, Greater Manchester, England.

Playing career
Ashcroft joined his hometown club Wigan during the Second World War. He made his début for Wigan in December 1942 against Oldham, and signed professional terms with the club a month later.

International honours 
Ashcroft won caps for England while at Wigan in 1946 against Wales, in 1947 against France, and Wales, in 1948 against France, in 1949 against France, and Other Nationalities, in 1950 against Wales, and France, in 1951 against Other Nationalities, Wales, and France, and won caps for Great Britain in 1947 against New Zealand (2 matches), in 1950 against Australia (2 matches), New Zealand, and Australia, and in 1954 against Australia (3 matches), and New Zealand (2 matches). He was also a reserve-to-travel for British Empire XIII in 1952 against New Zealand, and appeared ten times for Lancashire.

Championship final appearances
Ernie Ashcroft played , i.e. number 5, in Wigan's 13-9 victory over Dewsbury in the Championship Final first-leg during the 1943–44 season at Central Park, Wigan on Saturday 13 May 1944, and played  in the 12-5 victory over Dewsbury in the Championship Final second-leg during the 1943–44 season at Crown Flatt, Dewsbury on Saturday 20 May 1944, played left-, i.e. number 4 and scored two tries in the 13-4 victory over Huddersfield in the Championship Final during the 1945–46 season at Maine Road, Manchester on Saturday 18 May 1946, and played left- in the 13-4 victory over Dewsbury in the Championship Final during the 1946–47 season at Maine Road, Manchester on Saturday 21 June 1947.

County League appearances
Ernie Ashcroft played in Wigan's victories in the Lancashire League during the 1946–47 season, 1949–50 season and 1951–52 season.

Challenge Cup Final appearances
Ernie Ashcroft played left-, i.e. number 4, in Wigan's 8-3 victory over Bradford Northern in the 1947–48 Challenge Cup Final during the 1947–48 season at Wembley Stadium, London on Saturday 1 May 1948, in front of a crowd of 91,465.

County Cup Final appearances
Ernie Ashcroft played right-, i.e. number 3, and scored a try in Wigan's 3-7 defeat by Widnes in the 1945–46 Lancashire Cup Final during the 1945–46 season at Wilderspool Stadium, Warrington on Saturday 27 October 1945, played left-, i.e. number 4, in the 9-3 victory over Belle Vue Rangers in the 1946–47 Lancashire Cup Final during the 1946–47 season at Station Road, Swinton, on Saturday 26 October 1946, played  in the 10-7 victory over Belle Vue Rangers in the 1947–48 Lancashire Cup Final during the 1947–48 season at Wilderspool Stadium, Warrington, on Saturday 1 November 1947, played left- in the 14-8 victory over Warrington in the 1948–49 Lancashire Cup Final during the 1948–49 season at Station Road, Swinton, on Saturday 13 November 1948, played left- in the 20-7 victory over Leigh in the 1949–50 Lancashire Cup Final during the 1949–50 season at Wilderspool Stadium, Warrington, on Saturday 29 October 1949. played left- in the 14-6 victory over Leigh in the 1951–52 Lancashire Cup Final during the 1951–52 season at Station Road, Swinton on Saturday 27 October 1951, played left- in the 8-16 defeat by St. Helens in the 1953–54 Lancashire Cup Final during the 1953-54 season at Station Road, Swinton on Saturday 24 October 1953, played left- in the 8-13 defeat by Oldham in the 1957–58 Lancashire Cup Final during the 1957–58 season at Station Road, Swinton on Saturday 19 October 1957, played left-, and was coach/captain in Huddersfield's 10-16 defeat by Wakefield Trinity in the 1960–61 Yorkshire Cup Final during the 1960–61 season at Headingley Rugby Stadium, Leeds on Saturday 29 October 1960.

Honours 
Championship (5): 1943–44, 1945–46, 1946–47, 1949–50, 1951–52

Challenge Cup (1): 1948

Lancashire League (4): 1945–46, 1946–47, 1949–50, 1951–52

Lancashire Cup (5): 1946–47, 1947–48, 1948–49, 1949–50, 1951–52.

Genealogical information
Ernie Ashcroft's marriage to Vera (née Dean) was registered on 23 February 1952 in Wigan district.

References

External links
Statistics at wigan.rlfans.com
(archived by archive.is) U.K. League Hooker in Doubt
Statistics at wolvesplayers.thisiswarrington.co.uk

1925 births
1985 deaths
British Empire rugby league team players
England national rugby league team players
English rugby league coaches
English rugby league players
Great Britain national rugby league team captains
Great Britain national rugby league team players
Huddersfield Giants captains
Huddersfield Giants coaches
Huddersfield Giants players
Lancashire rugby league team players
Rugby league players from Wigan
Rugby league centres
Rugby league fullbacks
Warrington Wolves players
Warrington Wolves coaches
Wigan Warriors players